"Jubel" (Germanic languages: "cheers", "jubilance") is a song by French duo Klingande. It features uncredited vocals by French singer Lucie Decarne and saxophone by British musician Snake Davis. It was published on SoundCloud and YouTube on 16 March 2013 and first released commercially on 5 April 2013, and went on to top the charts in numerous European countries across 2013 and 2014.

Commercial performance
The song first charted in France, where it debuted at number 117 in April 2013, eventually peaking at number five in March 2014. It first reached number one in Germany in October 2013, spending seven weeks on top, and reached number one in Austria and Switzerland in November 2013. It further topped the charts in Italy and the Flanders region of Belgium in January 2014, as well as the airplay charts of Poland, Slovakia and the Czech Republic later in 2014. On the UK Singles Chart, it debuted and peaked at number three in June 2014, and it also reached number three in Australia in August 2014.

Music video
The music video was released on the duo's YouTube channel on 17 September 2013, and on the Kontor Records channel three days later. It was directed by Michael Johansson and Johan Rosell, and was filmed on the Danish island of Møn, as well as in the Swedish city of Malmö. Johansson explained that the location of Møn was chosen by searching for "the most beautiful place in Denmark", as a short deadline prevented the Swedish director's initial plans of filming in the south of France or Croatia. The video was originally intended to have a storyline, but had to be shortened to fit the radio edit of the song, so they instead chose to just "[capture] the mood of the track". As of March 2023, the video has over 210 million views on YouTube.

Charts

Weekly charts

Year-end charts

Certifications

Release history

References

2013 singles
2013 songs
Klingande songs
Number-one singles in Austria
Number-one singles in Germany
Number-one singles in Italy
Number-one singles in Poland
Number-one singles in Switzerland
Ultra Music singles
Ultratop 50 Singles (Flanders) number-one singles
Tropical house songs
Songs written by Klingande